Alexander (70–80 AD –  150) of Cotiaeum was a Greek grammarian, who is mentioned among the instructors of the Roman emperor Marcus Aurelius.  We still possess an epitaph pronounced upon him by the rhetorician Aelius Aristides, who had studied under Alexander.

References

Ancient Greek grammarians
2nd-century Greek people
Ancient Greeks in Rome
People from Roman Anatolia
Year of birth unknown
Year of death unknown
People from Kütahya